The Community Chest of Hong Kong is an independent, nonprofit organization established on 8 November 1968 in Hong Kong. As one of the most important charities in Hong Kong, The Community Chest serves as an umbrella organization to provide grants to a wide range of community projects.

Vision
The goal of The Community Chest is to work for the betterment of Hong Kong through the support by millions and to build a caring society through greater participation and giving by the Hong Kong community.

Mission
The mission statements of the Community Chest are:
 to obtain donations through community wide appeals on behalf of member social welfare agencies;
 to act as trustee of the donors and allocate funds raised prudently to member agencies to strengthen and maximize their services to the needy;
 to provide an integrated service for donors wishing to support a wide range of welfare services in Hong Kong.

Administration
The Community Chest is governed by a Board. Under the Board, there are four main committees: the Executive Committee, the Campaign Committee, the Public Relations Committee and the Admissions, Budgets and Allocations Committee. Over 300 volunteers serving on various sub-committees contribute to support the work of these committees. They also work with the 40 staff at the Chest office to accomplish their fundraising target each year and allocate these funds to over 140 social welfare agencies.

Each year, more than 1.7 million needy people benefit from the fundraising programs organized by the Chest. The Chest's administrative costs are subsidized by an annual grant from The Hong Kong Jockey Club, and by returns on investments. Therefore, the Chest is able to allocate 100% of the donations it receives to the beneficiaries without any deduction for administrative expenses.

Member agencies
There are over 140 member agencies of the Chest in 2010. They are:

(Agency names are listed in alphabetical order)

Services Supported (Baseline Allocations)

Elderly Services
There are residential services, community support services, carer support services, and empowerment and health services. The Community Chest of Hong Kong collaborates with its member agencies such as Helping Hand and Caritas Hong Kong, to provide services for the elderly in Hong Kong.

Family and Child Welfare Services
For child welfare services, there are day care services, developmental and supportive services, residential child care services and child protection services.
For family welfare services, there are 5 components: family support services, services for families with special needs, services for family reunion and new arrivals, services for women/men as well as parent education.

Rehabilitation and Aftercare Services
Eight groups of people are provided with aftercare and rehabilitation services from the Community Chest of Hong Kong. They are the visually impaired, the hearing impaired, the mentally handicapped, the physically handicapped, people who are chronically ill, drug-abusers, ex-offenders and people with other disabilities.

Children and Youth Services
In services provided to children and youth, provision of after school care services is one of the major parts. Also, youth counselling and recreational services are provided in youth centres. While collaborating with organisations like The Hong Kong Award for Young People and The Hong Kong Federation of Youth Groups, developmental and supportive services are provided. Furthermore, training is provided for the youth with collaborations of Hong Kong Air Cadet Corps and Boys' Brigade, Hong Kong, etc. Play-related services are also provided.

Medical and Health Services
Medical treatment is provided and community health care is also given out in the form of programmes such as health maintenance program and cancer education. Other services like recreational therapy and ambulance services are also provided.

Community Development and Other Services
Community services, counselling and befriending services, services for street sleepers, employment services and volunteer services are provided in different communities in Hong Kong.

Major Events

Dress Special Day
"Dress Special Day" (公益服飾日, formerly named "Dress Casual Day" 公益金便服日), first launched in 1993, is a day when participants can dress in their favourite wear to work or to school and at the same time to raise funds for charity. It has run become a popular fund-raising event with an increasing number of participants every year. Each participant who raises/donates HK$60 can join the event while no minimum is set for student participants.

As more and more employers began to encourage their employees to go to work in their casual wear, "Dress Casual Day" was renamed "Dress Special Day" in 2006. In doing so, the theme of this activity can be more flexible and vivid. It is hoped that donation can reach a higher peak by drawing strength from more participants.

Website for the year 2009

Walks for Millions
"Walks for Millions" is a flagship fund-raising event of the Community Chest. It was first launched in 1971. People can participate in the walk by soliciting donation from friends and relatives. A number of walks were organised at major infrastructures before their official opening to public use. Until campaign year 2009/2010, over 3 million participants have joined this meaningful event and 160 walks have been organised by The Community Chest.

"Community for the Chest" Television Show
"Community for the Chest" Television Show is another major initiative. It is jointly produced by The Community Chest and Television Broadcast Limited. Local celebrities, prominent social elites and famous stars pitch in their efforts to rally support from the general public. There are many innovative and entertaining programmes rolled out to raise funds for the Chest's member social welfare agencies.

The Community Chest Corporate Challenge Half Marathon
Runners from Corporations and organisations pitched in their support by joining the 10 km Run and 21 km Half Marathon to raise funds to designated services supported by The Community Chest.

Corporate and Employee Contribution Programme
A major fund-raising programme providing a direct channel for corporations and employees to make donations. Total contribution from corporations and employees, raised through direct donations, self-organised fundraising events or CARE Scheme – monthly payroll deduction, are recognised through a joint award scheme.

Under this programme, special events are organised to seek both corporate and public support.

Love Teeth Day
Love Teeth Day aims to arouse public awareness on oral health whilst raising funds for the needy. In return, a "Love Teeth Day Pack" with various oral care products will be presented to participants as gesture of appreciation.

Green Day
Green Day aims to arouse public awareness on environmental protection and, at the same time, raise funds for the needy. Participants are encouraged to solicit sponsorship to perform their own "GREEN" acts to support the event.

Skip Lunch Day
This event is held to encourage people to donate their lunch fees to support the needy.
Each donor will be given a Skip Lunch Day Coupon by making a donation of HK$30 or more. In 2010, this event was supported by nearly 300 organisations and government departments.
Over HK$1.6 million was raised.

Stock Code Balloting Scheme for Charity
Hong Kong Exchanges and Clearing Limited (HKEx) has always been a staunch partner of The Community Chest of Hong Kong. To encourage listed companies to re-invest into the local community, HKEx has initiated "Stock Code Balloting for Charity Scheme" in 1999 to give each company listing on Stock Exchange of Hong Kong the option to choose its stock code by making a donation to The Community Chest and help channel invaluable resources to the local social welfare services.

Celebrations for the Chest
In lieu of gifts to celebrate birthdays, weddings, anniversaries, opening for new businesses and other special occasions, donors can share their happiness with the needy by donating to the Chest through this year-round programme.

Greening for the Chest
"Greening for the Chest", jointly organised by The Community Chest and Education Bureau, aims to convey the message of environmental protection among the youth. Over the years, students from the 18 Districts Community Youth Clubs have been encouraged to take part in cleaning, planting and tree tendering in country parks, and at the same time, raise funds for the needy in Hong Kong.

With the assistance from Leisure and Cultural Services Department and Agriculture, Fisheries and Conservation Department, organisations could also clean or plant at designated locations for a better cause.

Flag Day
The Chest always encourages the younger generation to take an active role in serving the community and the annual "Flag Day" provides an ideal channel for the youth to realise their benevolent initiatives.

Each year, more than 12,000 students and volunteers from primary and secondary schools, kindergartens, the Chest's member agencies, as well as other voluntary organisations participate in "Street Flag Sale". Together with the significant contributions from schools participating in "Gold Flag Sale", the event has helped raise a generous amount of resources.

Donation
There are two types of general donation, namely monthly donation and one-off donation.
Monthly donation can be made through autopay or credit cards. One-off donation can be made on-line by internet donation, by credit card, by cheque, by phone, via 7-Eleven outlets or electronic teller machines. In campaign year 2008/2009, The Community Chest has raised a total of 18,005,080 Hong Kong Dollars.

Allocation of Fund Raised
In 2009/2010, The Community Chest allocated over HK$180 million to its member agencies: 32% on Rehabilitation and Aftercare Services, 15% on Children and Youth Services, 10% on Elderly Services, 19% on Community Development and Other Services, 18% on Family and Child Welfare Services, and also used 6% of the fund raised in advocating Medical and Health Services.

Rainbow Fund
To help people who are in an emergency financial crisis, the Chest has initiated an emergency relief fund in early 2004. The Community Chest "Cheung Kong" Rainbow Fund helps:
 individuals and families with imminent needs – threat to survival; or
 individuals and families with imminent needs – otherwise causing irreversible damage and social consequences;
 the marginalised in society, and those who may be caught between gaps.

Approval of Fund Allocation
 The application forms, supporting documents and the past work of the organisations will be considered.
 The Chest will consult different professionals in society including government officials.
 The Chest will make co-ordination with the government's policy for the best results.
 Any fund allocation is approved by an independent committee.

Supervision of Fund Allocation
 Member agencies are requested to submit work progress reports with the output and outcomes of the funds stated bi-annually.
 Auditors' reports are used as reference.
 Regular visits to member agencies are conducted.

See also
 Community Chest (organization)

References

External links
 Official page Retrieved 10 April 2010]

1968 establishments in Hong Kong
Charities based in Hong Kong
Social welfare charities
Free Methodist Church
The Salvation Army
Deafness charities
Blindness charities
Organizations established in 1968